Lina Strand (born 23 December 1988) is a Swedish orienteering competitor, born in Gothenburg. She won a bronze medal in the relay at the 2012 European Orienteering Championships in Falun.

She competed at the 2012 World Orienteering Championships. In the middle distance she qualified for the final, where she placed 11th. To date, her greatest achievements at the World Orienteering Championships have been coming second in the Long Distance in 2019, first in the Sprint Relay in 2017 and third in the Mixed Sprint Relay in 2016.

Strand ranked third at the 2017 World Games in Wrocław, Poland.

References

External links

1988 births
Living people
Swedish orienteers
Female orienteers
Foot orienteers
World Orienteering Championships medalists
World Games bronze medalists
Competitors at the 2017 World Games
World Games medalists in orienteering
Sportspeople from Gothenburg